The Abdou Building is a historic seven-story building in El Paso, Texas. It was built for the Rio Grande Valley Bank in 1910,  and designed by Trost & Trost. In 1925, it was renamed the Abdou Building after its new owner, Sam Abdou, who purchased it for $150,000. The same year, the American Trust and Saving Bank leased the building; one of its directors, Charles Klink  was Abdou's stepson. By 1930, the El Paso Bank and Leavell & Sherman both had offices in the building. It has been listed on the National Register of Historic Places since September 24, 1980.

References

Buildings and structures completed in 1910
Buildings and structures in El Paso, Texas
National Register of Historic Places in El Paso County, Texas
Trost & Trost buildings